Rhombodera crassa is a species of praying mantises in the family Mantidae, found in Indomalaya.

See also
List of mantis genera and species

References

Further reading

 

c
Mantodea of Asia
Insects described in 1912